The Holland Series has been the annual championship series of the highest level of professional baseball in the Netherlands since 1987, concluding the postseason of Honkbal Hoofdklasse. It is played between the two winners of the playoffs.

The Holland Series championship is determined through a best-of-seven playoff.

Neptunus Rotterdam have played in 22 of the 28 Holland Series and have won 18 Holland Series championships, more than any other Hoofdklasse franchise.

Results

Champions

Records

See also
Baseball awards in Honkbal Hoofdklasse
Baseball awards in Europe

References

 
Baseball competitions in the Netherlands
Recurring sporting events established in 1987